A superhero (also known as a "super hero" or "super-hero") is a fictional character "of unprecedented physical prowess dedicated to acts of derring-do in the public interest." Since the debut of Superman in 1938 by Jerry Siegel and Joe Shuster, stories of superheroes — ranging from brief episodic adventures to continuing years-long sagas — have dominated American comic books and crossed over into other media. A female superhero is sometimes called a "superheroine."

By most definitions, characters need not have actual superhuman powers to be deemed superheroes, although sometimes terms such as "costumed crimefighters" are used to refer to those without such powers who have many other common traits of superheroes.

For a list of comic book supervillain debuts, see List of comic book supervillain debuts.

1900s

Newspaper comics

Despite its short run, it is seen as the earliest superhero fiction comic.

Play

Often cited as perhaps the earliest superhero akin to those to become popularized through American comic books.

1910s

Magazine

Novel

1920s

Notable non-superhero characters that influenced the superhero genre

1930s

Radio

Pulp fiction

Newspaper comics

Other media

Notable non-superhero characters that influenced the superhero genre

Comic book

1940s

Newspaper comics

Comic book

1950s

Comic book

Television

Manga

1960s

Comic book

Television

Radio

1970s

Comic book

Movies

Television

1980s

Comic book

Movies

Television

Other Media

1990s

Comic book

Movies

Television

2000s

Comic book

Manga/Anime

Movies

Television

2010s

Comic book

Manga/Anime

Movies

Television

2020s

Comic book

Movies

Television

See also
List of years in comics
List of comic book supervillain debuts

Notes

References
Daniels, Les.  The Golden Age of DC Comics: 365 Days.  New York: H.N. Abrams, 2004.

External links
Comic Book Timeline
Guardians of the North
"The Comic Book Villain, Dr. Fredric Wertham, M.D."
The Silver Age and the Marvel Age at Web Cite
The Bronze Age at Web Cite
The Gimmick Age at Web Cite
Coville, Jamie. "The History of Superhero Comic Books", "Part 1: Comic Strips Lead to a New Form"
Evanier, Mark. "News from Me", POV Online, August 26, 2001

Comics-related lists
Comic book publication histories
Debuts